The Kulim Hi-Tech Park (KHTP) is an industrial park for high technology enterprises located in Kulim District, Kedah, Malaysia. It was opened in 1996 and is Malaysia's first high-tech industrial park.

The park, a key component in the nation's plan to be fully industrialised by 2020, is operated by Kulim Technology Park Corporation Sdn Bhd, a subsidiary of the Kedah State Development Corporation.

Government
Kulim Hi-Tech Industrial Park Local Authority is the local authority of Kulim Hi-Tech Park.

Tenants
The major companies located at Kulim Hi-Tech Park are First Solar, Infineon Technologies and Intel. Companies located in KHTP :-
 AT&S
 AIC Semiconductor
Aicello Malaysia
 BASF
 BCM Electronics Corp 
 Celestica
 Entegris
 Everbest Biotech
 First Solar
 Fuji Electrics
 Fujimi Micro Technology
 Fronkten Malaysia
 Hamadatec
 Hoya Electronics
 Infineon Technologies
 Intel
 MIMOS
 Menicon Malaysia
 Molnlycke Healthcare
 NextGlass Technologies
 NUR Distribution
 OSRAM
 Ferro Tech
 Peritone Health
 Primelux Energy
 Risen Solar Technologies 
 Showa Denko 
 Sentienx
 Silterra Malaysia
 SIRIM Berhad
 Smartrac Technology
 Teleflex Medical
 Tomoe Industrial Gas
 United Caps
 Toyo Memory Technology
 Wong Engineering Industries 
 Whizz Systems
 Jinjing Technology
 Kulim Industrial Gases

Buildings

 KTPC 1 ( KHTP Business Centre )
 KTPC2 ( KHTP Techno Centre )
 KTPC3 (KHTP IT Centre )
 KTPC4 ( KHTP Admin Centre Lot 1-6 )
 KTPC5 ( KHTP Admin Centre Lot 7-13 )
 KTPC6 ( KHTP Admin Centre Lot 14-19 )
 KTPC9 
 KTPC17 
 KTPC18
 KTPC19
 KHTP Sport Complex

School
Taman Hi-Tech School (Jawi: سكوله كبڠساءن تامن هاي-تيك) is a school in Kulim Techno City (KTC), located 5 kilometers from Kulim city centre.

References

1996 establishments in Malaysia
High-technology business districts in Malaysia
Kulim District